Sayyid Barghash bin Said al-Busaidi,(1836 – 26 March 1888), was an Omani Sultan and the son of Said bin Sultan, was the second Sultan of Zanzibar. Barghash ruled Zanzibar from 7 October 1870 to 26 March 1888.

Early life and reign

Barghash was born around 1836–1838 to Omani sultan, Said bin Sultan and an Ethiopian concubine. He was described as having sharp and charming character. He succeeded his elder half-brother Majid in 1871, having openly and adamantly contested his rule, and at one point was arrested for treason and exiled to India and Bombay. Upon becoming sultan his reign became successful and is credited with building much of the infrastructure of Stone Town, including piped water, public baths, a police force, roads, parks, hospitals and large administrative buildings such as the (Bait el-Ajaib) House of Wonders. He was perhaps the last Sultan to maintain a measure of true independence from European control. He did consult with European "advisors" who had immense influence, but he was still the central figure they wrestled to control. He crossed wits with diplomats from Britain, America, Germany, France and Portugal and was often able to play one country off. It was his son, Khalid bin Barghash, who while vying for the succession, was the loser in the Shortest War. 
In 1859 a dispute broke out between the brothers Sayyid Majid, the second Sultan of Zanzibar, and Barghash. Their sister Sayyida Salme bint Said (later Emily Ruete) acted (at the age of fifteen) as secretary of Barghash's party. However, with the help of an English gunboat the insurrection of Barghash was soon brought to an end, and Barghash was sent into exile in Bombay for two years.

After the death of Majid, Barghash became Sultan. Ruote wrote in 1886:

According to Ruete, Barghash did not release Khalifah before one of their sisters prepared to set out for a pilgrimage for Mecca, and "he did not want to bring down upon himself a curse pronounced in the Holy City of the Prophet. But his sister did not pardon him before he had set free the innocent Chalîfe."

Sayyid Barghash had a treaty with the British to help stop the slave trade in Zanzibar, but he was not always scrupulous in his commitment. In the late-1860s, he was suspected of taking money from the slave traders to allow them to continue the practice, and he maintained this double deal for some years; HMS Daphne liberated 2000 slaves in the Indian Ocean over many years, mainly near Zanzibar.

In June 1873 John Kirk was acting British Consul and received simultaneous and contradictory instructions from London, one to issue an ultimatum to the Sultan under threat of blockade that the slave trade must be unequivocally stopped and the slave market closed, and the other not to actually enforce a blockade which might be taken as an act of war pushing Zanzibar towards French protection. Kirk only showed the first instruction to Barghash, who capitulated within two weeks signing a further treaty with Britain prohibiting slave trade in his kingdom, and immediately closing the great slave market.

Towards the end of his reign Barghash had to witness the disintegration of his inherited empire. In 1884 the German adventurer Carl Peters made African chiefs on the Tanganyika mainland sign documents which declared their areas to be under German "protection". In February 1885 these acquisitions were ratified by the German Government through an imperial letter of protection. Few weeks later in April 1885, the German Dehnhardt brothers concluded a contract with the Sultan of Witu (former ruler of Pate) on the Kenya Coast near Lamu which was also put under official German protection. Bargash tried to send troops against the Witu ruler who in his view anyhow was supposed to be his subject when the appearance of a German fleet forced him to accept the German intrusion.

The British-German agreement of 29 October 1886 acknowledged the Sultan's rule over a 10-mile-strip along the coast from Portuguese Mozambique up to the Tana River and some towns on the Somali coast. This agreement, however, was only short-lived as it cut the German areas of influence off the sea.

Bargash did not live to see the 1888 agreement come into force which signed off the coastal strip of later Tanganyika to the Germans resulting in the uprising of the Sultans' subjects against the Germans and its subsequent repression.

In 1896, Bargash's son Khalid proclaimed himself sultan but was deposed after rejecting a British ultimatum which led to the 40 minute Anglo-Zanzibar War.

Honours
Grand Cross of the Order of the Tower and Sword of Portugal (GCTE) 1875
Grand Cross of the Order of the Red Eagle, 1st Class in brilliants of Prussia 1875
Grand Cross of the Legion of Honour 1875
Knight Grand Cross of the Order of St Michael and St George (GCMG) 1883

References

Sources
Ruete, Emily, (1888): Memoirs of an Arabian Princess from Zanzibar (Many reprints)
Ruete, Emily,  Ulrich Haarmann (Editor), E. Van Donzel (Editor), Leiden, Netherlands, (1992): An Arabian Princess Between Two Worlds: Memoirs, Letters Home, Sequels to the Memoirs, Syrian Customs and Usages.  Presents the reader with a picture of life in Zanzibar between 1850 and 1865. 

Al Said dynasty
1837 births
1888 deaths
Barghash bin Said
Honorary Knights Grand Cross of the Order of St Michael and St George
Grand Croix of the Légion d'honneur
Zanzibari royalty
19th-century Arabs
19th-century Omani people